William Andrew Goddard III (born March 29, 1937) is the Charles and Mary Ferkel Professor of Chemistry and Applied Physics, and Director of the Materials and Process Simulation Center at the California Institute of Technology.

Early life and education
William A. Goddard III was born in El Centro California and lived his early years in farm towns across California (El Centro, Delano, Indio, Lodi, Oildale, MacFarland, Firebaugh, also Yuma AZ), where his dad made the wooden boxes used to ship agricultural products. He always dreamed of living in Los Angeles. Goddard earned a BS in Engineering from the University of California at Los Angeles in 1960 and PhD in Engineering Science with a minor in Physics from Caltech in 1964. He has four children (Bill, Suzy, Cecilia, Lisa) and has been married for 58 years.

Career
He joined the chemistry faculty at Caltech in November 1964 where he remains today as a professor and researcher.

After his Ph.D. he remained at the California Institute of Technology as Arthur Amos Noyes Research Fellow (1964–66), Professor of Theoretical Chemistry (1967–78) and Professor of Chemistry & Applied Physics (1978-).
Goddard has made many contributions to theoretical chemistry, such as the generalized valence bond (GVB) method for ab initio electronic structure calculations and the ReaxFF force field for classical molecular dynamics simulations.

He is a member of the International Academy of Quantum Molecular Science and the U.S. National Academy of Sciences.

In August 2007, the American Chemical Society at its biannual national convention celebrated Goddard's 70th birthday with a 5-day symposium titled, "Bold predictions in theoretical chemistry."

As of November 2017, Goddard has published 1160 peer-reviewed articles.

References

External links
Homepage of William A. Goddard III

1937 births
Members of the United States National Academy of Sciences
Living people
people from El Centro, California
21st-century American chemists
California Institute of Technology alumni
California Institute of Technology faculty
Members of the International Academy of Quantum Molecular Science
Theoretical chemists
Computational chemists